Porta Westfalica is a railway station located in Porta Westfalica, Germany. The original station was opened in 1847 and the current station was completed in 1916. It is located on the Hamm–Minden railway. The train services are operated by Deutsche Bahn and WestfalenBahn.

Train services
The station is served by the following services:

Regional services  Minden – Porta Westfalica – Herford – Bielefeld – Hamm – Dortmund – Essen – Duisburg – Düsseldorf Airport – Düsseldorf – Neuss – Cologne – Cologne/Bonn Airport
Regional services  Rheine - Osnabrück - Minden - Hanover - Braunschweig
Regional services  Bielefeld - Herford - Minden - Hanover - Braunschweig
Regional services  Bielefeld - Herford - Minden - Nienburg

Notes 

Railway stations in North Rhine-Westphalia
Railway stations in Germany opened in 1847
1847 establishments in Prussia
Buildings and structures in Minden-Lübbecke